Sphaerodothis is a genus of fungi in the family Phyllachoraceae.

Species
As accepted by Species Fungorum;

Sphaerodothis arengae 
Sphaerodothis balansae 
Sphaerodothis borassi 
Sphaerodothis circumscripta 
Sphaerodothis consociata 
Sphaerodothis densa 
Sphaerodothis furcraeae 
Sphaerodothis gaultheriae 
Sphaerodothis guilielmae 
Sphaerodothis luquillensis 
Sphaerodothis merianiae 
Sphaerodothis merrillii 
Sphaerodothis pirifera 
Sphaerodothis raoi 
Sphaerodothis schweinfurthii 
Sphaerodothis tetracerae 
Sphaerodothis trinitensis 
Sphaerodothis viticifoliae 

Former species;
 S. acrocomiae  = Camarotella costaricensis, Phyllachoraceae
 S. acrocomiae  = Camarotella acrocomiae, Phyllachoraceae
 S. antioquensis  = Phyllachora columbiensis, Phyllachoraceae
 S. arxii  = Parberya arxii, Phyllachoraceae
 S. calospora  = Sphaerodothella danthoniae, Phyllachoraceae
 S. chamaeropis  = Phaeochora steinheilii, Phaeochoraceae
 S. coimbatorica  = Malthomyces coimbatoricus, Phyllachoraceae
 S. columbiensis  = Phyllachora columbiensis, Phyllachoraceae
 S. dactylidis  = Phyllachora dactylidis, Phyllachoraceae
 S. danthoniae  = Sphaerodothella danthoniae, Phyllachoraceae
 S. diplothemiifolii  = Phaeochoropsis diplothemiifolii, Phaeochoraceae
 S. gramineae  = Phyllachora cynodontis, Phyllachoraceae
 S. livistonae  = Phaeochora livistonae, Phaeochoraceae
 S. magnifica  = Sphaerodothella danthoniae, Phyllachoraceae
 S. neowashingtoniae  = Phaeochoropsis neowashingtoniae, Phaeochoraceae
 S. palmicola  = Coccostromopsis palmicola, Phyllachoraceae
 S. phoenicis  = Serenomyces phoenicis, Phaeochoraceae
 S. poincianae  = Phyllachora schizolobiicola, Phyllachoraceae
 S. portoricensis  = Phyllachora portoricensis, Phyllachoraceae
 S. pringlei  = Apodothina pringlei, Sordariomycetes
 S. rimosa  = Camarotella acrocomiae, Phyllachoraceae
 S. scleriae  = Phyllachora scleriae, Phyllachoraceae
 S. sphaerosperma  = Phyllachora sphaerosperma, Phyllachoraceae
 S. steinheilii  = Phaeochora steinheilii, Phaeochoraceae
 S. torrendiella  = Camarotella torrendiella, Phyllachoraceae

References

External links
Index Fungorum

Sordariomycetes genera
Phyllachorales